Cavinula is a genus of diatoms belonging to the family Cavinulaceae.

Species:

Cavinula altana 
Cavinula breenii 
Cavinula buben

References

Naviculales
Diatom genera